The black gay pride movement is a movement within the United States and elsewhere for black members of the LGBT community. Started in the 1990s, Black Gay Pride movements began as a way to provide black LGBT people an alternative to the largely white mainstream LGBT movement. According to some, white gay prides are seen to enforce, both consciously and unconsciously, a long history of ignoring the people of color who share in their experiences. The history of segregation seen in other organizations such as nursing associations, journalism associations, and fraternities is carried on into the black gay prides seen today. The exclusion of people of color in gay pride events is perceived by some to play into existing undertones of white superiority and racist political movements. 

In response, the movement serves as a way for black LGBT people to discuss specific issues that are more unique to the black LGBT community and celebrate the progress of the black LGBT community. While the mainstream gay pride movement, often perceived as overwhelmingly white, has focused  much of its energy on same-sex marriage, the Black Gay Pride movement has focused on issues such as racism, homophobia, and lack of proper health and mental care in black communities.

Today, there are about 20 black gay pride events all over the United States. The largest of these events have historically been D.C. Black Pride and Atlanta Black Pride. While black pride events started as early as 1988, D.C. Black Pride, which began in 1991, has been cited as one of the earliest celebrations. The D.C. Black Pride celebration started out of a tradition called the Children's Hour 15 years prior.

Center for Black Equity 

Formerly known as the International Federation of Black Prides until 2012, the Center for Black Equity (CBE), is an international organization dedicated to equality and social justice for black LGBT people. On October 13, 2013, CBE president Earl Fowles, along with Congresswoman Eleanor Holmes Norton, announced a name change from IFBP to the Center for Black Equity. Though the organization began as a way to support the network of black gay pride celebrations worldwide, CBE now also focuses on social justice issues as well.

The International Federation of Black Prides started during DC Black Pride of May 1999 by a coalition of Black Pride organizers representing Chicago, North Carolina, New York City, Atlanta, Detroit, Minneapolis, and Washington, DC. The coalition saw a need to organize the twenty-plus Black Prides in the United States and abroad for the purpose of developing sponsorship strategies, providing technical assistance, networking, mentoring, and supporting one another. IFBP acquired its IRS 501(c)(3) non-profit status in November 2004.

Most popular events 

The two largest black gay pride celebrations in the world are based in Atlanta, Georgia and Washington, D.C.

Atlanta Black Pride 
Created in 1996, Atlanta Black Pride weekend (ABPW) is the only official event for the black LGBT community in Atlanta. The event was partially inspired by a group of black gay friends who decided to have annual Labor Day picnics together at Piedmont Park. It has grown to be the largest black gay pride event in the world with a plethora of events catering to the black LGBT community.

D.C. Black Pride 
D.C. Black Pride is the earliest and the second largest black LGBT pride event. The event first took place on Saturday, May 25, 1991 at Banneker Field. Like all black LGBT celebrations, it started because the community did not see themselves fairly represented during D.C's annual Capital Pride. Event sponsors include CBE and Capital Pride.

See also

Black pride
At the Beach LA
 Dallas Black Pride
 Hotter than July (Detroit)
 UK Black Pride

General:
African-American LGBT community
Ball culture
House music
J-Setting

References

Further reading
 Padva, Gilad (2014). Black Nostalgia: Poetry, Ethnicity, and Homoeroticism in Looking for Langston and Brother to Brother. In Padva, Gilad, Queer Nostalgia in Cinema and Pop Culture, pp. 199–226. Palgrave Macmillan, .

LGBT African-American culture
LGBT pride